Consejo is the fourth studio album by the Puerto Rican rock band La Secta AllStar, released on May 3, 2005, by Universal Latino. Three singles were released: "Consejo", "Este Corazón" and "La Locura Automática".

The album has collaborations with artists like Wilkins and reggaeton artists Wisin & Yandel. A remix of "La Locura Automática" is on 12 Discípulos, a reggaeton album produced by Eddie Dee, and on the deluxe edition of Consejo, along with another remix and a bonus DVD.

In December 2005, the album was chosen as one of the 20 Most Significant Albums of 2005 by the National Foundation of Popular Culture.

Track listing 
 "Consejo" - 4:06
 "Este Corazón" - 4:46
 "La Locura Automática" - 4:50
 "Llora Mi Corazón" - 3:09
 "El Perdedor" - 4:34
 "No Te Lloraré" - 3:13
 "Todo Por Ti" - 5:02
 "Comedia De Amor" - 3:59
 "Wanna Wanna" - 4:06
 "La Vida Nos Acerca" - 4:24

Awards
Consejo was nominated for Grammy and Lo Nuestro awards, and won a Billboard award. In its first month, the album sold 80,000 copies.

Sales and certifications

References 

2005 albums
La Secta AllStar albums